Emtmannsberg is a municipality in the district of Bayreuth in Bavaria in Germany.

The Ölschnitz river begins near Emtmannsberg-Unterölschnitz at the confluence of the Laimbach and Bieberswöhrbach.

References

Bayreuth (district)